IDEO is a design and consulting firm with offices in the U.S., England, Germany, Japan, and China. It was founded in Palo Alto, California, in 1991. The company's 700 staff uses a design thinking approach to design products, services, environments, and digital experiences.

In 1996, Steelcase took a majority ownership stake in the firm, which continued to operate independently. By the early 2000s, the company had expanded into management consulting and organizational design. In 2016, Japanese holding company Kyu Collective purchased a minority stake in the firm, with Steelcase continuing to hold a small stake.

History
IDEO was formed in 1991 by a merger of David Kelley Design (founded by Stanford University professor David Kelley in 1978), London-based Moggridge Associates and San Francisco's ID Two (both founded by British-born Bill Moggridge, in 1969 and 1979, respectively), and Matrix Product Design (founded by Mike Nuttall in 1983).

In 1996, Office-furniture maker Steelcase took a majority ownership stake in the firm, which continued to operate independently.  Steelcase began divesting its shares through a five-year management buy-back program in 2007.  By the early 2000s, IDEO had expanded into management consulting and organizational design. In 2016, Japanese holding company Kyu Collective purchased a minority stake in the firm.

While the company started with a focus on designing consumer products (e.g., toothbrush, personal assistant, computers), by 2001, IDEO began to widen its focus on consumer experiences and services.

In 2011, IDEO incubated IDEO.org — a registered 501(c)(3) nonprofit focused on doing work the centers people in poor and vulnerable communities.
In April 2019, the company announced that Sandy Speicher would replace Tim Brown as CEO of the company.

The Deep Dive
On February 9, 1999, the ABC show Nightline featured IDEO in a segment called The Deep Dive: One Company's Secret Weapon for Innovation. The segment featured Jack Smith of ABC touring the IDEO office and challenging the company to redesign the shopping cart in five days to demonstrate IDEO's process for innovation. The end result was a shopping cart with a nestable steel frame which holds removable plastic baskets to help deter theft and increase shopper flexibility. A dual child seat with a swing-up tray was also included in the design, as well as a cup holder, a barcode reader to skip the checkout line and steerable back wheels for manoeuvrability. The demonstration of IDEO's innovation process has led to the segment becoming part of numerous curricula, including Project Lead the Way and multiple universities.

Acquisitions and partnerships 
On October 17, 2017, IDEO acquired Datascope — a data science firm based in Chicago. Datascope has worked with IDEO as a consultant on many projects over the past four years. Tim Brown, Chair of IDEO, states that the acquisition is largely motivated by advances in data sciences and machine learning. These advances allow for a bigger focus in human-centered applications including facilitation of the design process. Datascope's 15-person team will be moved to IDEO's Chicago office.

With IDEO's acquisition by Kyu, the firm increasingly partners with other member firms of the collective.

Organizational culture 
IDEO's organizational culture consists of project teams, flat hierarchy, individual autonomy, creativity, and collaboration. The firm currently employs over 700 people across many disciplines, including: Behavioral Science, Branding, Business Design, Communication Design, Design Research, Digital Design, Education, Electrical Engineering, Environments Design, Food Science, Healthcare Services, Industrial Design, Interaction Design, Mechanical Engineering, Organizational Design, and Software Engineering.

Products and services 

IDEO has worked on projects in the consumer food and beverage, retail, computer, medical, educational, furniture, office, and automotive industries. Some examples include Apple's first mouse, the Palm V PDA, and Steelcase's Leap chair. Clients include Air New Zealand, Coca-Cola, ConAgra Foods, Eli Lilly, Ford, Medtronic, Mexichem, Sealy, ShinHo, and Steelcase among many others.

OpenIDEO 

In August 2010, IDEO introduced OpenIDEO - a collaborative platform for the design process. OpenIDEO was designed to be an internal tool for IDEO to collaborate with clients, but it is now a public tool. The purpose of the tool is to virtually drive the creative process to solve social problems, allowing for people of different expertise and backgrounds to collaborate. Examples of projects that have been facilitated by OpenIDEO include various projects of the WWF and TEDPrize winner Jamie Oliver's Food Revolution movement. In a collaboration with Sutter Health, London's Helix Centre and Shoshana R. Ungerleider, they completed an OpenIDEO Challenge to "reimagine the end of life experience" which later led to the founding of international initiatives, End Well and Re:imagine.

Design education 

IDEO U is an online educational program released in early 2015. Course participants are instructed on the concepts surrounding human-centered design thinking.

In addition to the online program, IDEO and its affiliates have released multiple books on design thinking, including New York Times best-selling Creative Confidence: Unleashing the Creative Potential Within Us All. Former CEO Tim Brown is the author of Change by Design: How Design Thinking Transforms Organizations and Inspires Innovation (2009) in which he argues that design can transform problems into opportunities – emphasizing design thinking as a human-centered activity, he specifically prizes the feeling of empathy, where designers are capable of understanding the perspectives and problems the end users face.

Notes
 Dobbin, Frank. “High Commitment Practices”. Harvard University. October 10, 2012. Lecture.
 Thomke, Stefan and Ashok Nimgade. Ideo Product Development. 9-600-143. Boston. Harvard Business Publishing
 Kelley, Tom, and Jonathan Littman. The Art of Innovation: Lessons in Creativity from IDEO, America's Leading Design Firm. New York: Currency/Doubleday, 2001. page 70.
 “Recruiting Q&A: IDEO” Business week. January 10, 2001
 "Designed Chaos - An Interview with David Kelley, Founder and CEO of IDEO." Designed Chaos. N.p., n.d. 
 "Navigate." Careers FAQ. N.p., n.d. 
 Stevents, Tim. “Creative Genius”. Industry Week. July 4, 1994. Skokie, IL

References

Industrial design firms
Companies based in Palo Alto, California
Design companies established in 1991
Design companies of the United States
1991 establishments in California